Halligan can refer to:

Halligan (surname)
Halligan bar, a tool used by firefighters
USS Halligan (DD-584), a US Navy destroyer

See also

 Senator Halligan (disambiguation)